Sergio Zanni (born in Ferrara, 1942) is an Italian painter and sculptor.
After obtaining the Diploma at the Institute of Arts 'Dosso Dossi' in Ferrara, Italy, he graduated from the Academy of Arts (Accademia delle Belle Arti) in Bologna. He taught in the Institute of Arts 'Dosso Dossi' until 1995.
For his research in sculpturing he utilized backed clay and, successively, lighter material for sculptures of large dimensions.

Vittorio Sgarbi has defined Zanni a "surrealism from the Po Plain".

Solo and group art exhibitions 

 1973 – Centro attività visive, palazzo dei Diamanti, Ferrara
 1976 – Galleria Intermidia, Ferrara
 1978 – Chiesa di Santa Lucia, Bologna
 1979 – Accademia dei Concordi, Rovigo
 1980 – Artaga, galleria comunale, Faenza
 1981 – Aletheia – Lethe immaginale pagano, mostra itinerante, Palazzo dei Diamanti, Ferrara; Palazzo Alberini, Forlì; Loggetta Lombardesca, Ravenna
 1983 – Galleria Zarathustra, Milan
 1984 – Galleria Tommaseo, Trieste; Galleria l'Officina, Trieste; Galleria Cristina Busi, Chiavari; Galleria Minima, Reggio Emilia; La persistenza del mito nella pittura e scultura degli anni '80, Centro comunale di cultura, Valenza; Tridimensionale, Termoli; IV Rassegna internazionale della ceramica, Caltagirone
 1985 – Biennale di Milano
 1986 – Galleria Rossana Ferri, Modena; Teatro et Mitologie, Philippe Giumiot Art Gallery, Brussels
 1987 – Santa Maria delle Croci, Ravenna
 1988 – Galleria Il Bulino, Modena
 1989 – Galleria Il Girasole, Legnago
 1991 – Galleria Tommaseo, Trieste
 1992 – Sala Benvenuto da Garofalo, Palazzo dei Diamanti, Ferrara
 1993 – Galleria San Carlo, Milan; Galleria Rosso Tiziano, Piacenza; Galleria Modula Arte, Parma
 1995 – Circolo degli artisti, Faenza; La pittura e la scultura fantastica e visionaria, Centro culturale di esposizione e comunicazione "Le Zitelle", Venezia; Biennale del Bronzetto, Padova; Galleria Stadmaeuer, Villach, (Austria)
 1997 – Galleria Modula Arte, Parma; XXXVIII Mostra della ceramica, Castellamonte; Omaggio a Morandi, Grizzana Morandi; Ancora è calda l'erba sui miei prati, Galleria Forni, Milan
 1998 – Continuità dell'immagine, Galleria Davico, Torino
 1999 – Galleria Davico, Torino; Galleria Forni, Bologna
 2000 – Arte Fiera, Bologna
 2002 – Galleria Cristina Busi, Chiavari
 2005 – Etroubles, Museo a cielo aperto
 2006 – Galleria Forni, Bologna, Di Ulisse e d'altri viandanti
 2007 – Equilibri di viaggio, Balocco Art Hotel, Porto Cervo, Arzachena; Difformi forme, Galleria Marchesi, Ferrara; Biennale del Muro Dipinto 2007, Rocca Sforzesca – Pinacoteca, Dozza (Bologna); Copulamundi, C.ETRA, Castel Bolognese (Ravenna)
 2008 – Sergio Zanni – Viaggiatori, viandanti ed equilibristi, Cà Cornera, Porto Viro (Rovigo); Sebastiano tra sacro e profano, Monica Benini Arte, Ferrara; Anch'io Pinocchio, Galleria del Carbone, Ferrara
 2009 – Il cielo alla rovescia, Galleria del Carbone, Ferrara; Arte per Emergency, Galleria del Carbone, Ferrara; Sergio Zanni – L'Auriga, il Nichilista e il Viandante, Galleria del Carbone, Ferrara; Generazioni, Istituto d'Arte "Dosso Dossi", Palazzo Cavalieri, Ferrara; Tredicesima ora. 12 + 1 Interpretazioni sul tempo, Laboratorio di Ingegneria e Architettura Marchingegno
 2010 – Il cielo alla rovescia. Il cielo in una scatola. Omaggio a Galileo, Casa di Virginio Ariosto, Bondeno (FE); Puerto Sebastian: Il mito di San Sebastiano nell'arte contemporanea, Museo Parmeggiani, Cento (Ferrara); Sergio Zanni – Sculture e disegni, Galleria Cristina Busi, Chiavari (GE); Gallerie al Museo, MIC Museo Internazionale delle Ceramiche, Faenza (Ravenna)
 2011 – 54° Biennale di Venezia, Padiglione Italia, Venezia; Progetto Scultura 2011, Castel Sismondo, Rimini; In Illo Tempore/Daniela Carletti, Castello della Rocca, Cento (Ferrara)
 2012 – Illustrissimo Pinocchio – Immagini ferraresi, Portomaggiore (Ferrara); ...e come esuli pensieri..., Galleria del Carbone (Ferrara); Metamorfosi, Maurizio Bonora, Gianni Guidi, Sergio Zanni, Galleria del Carbone (Ferrara); Das Szenische in der Bildenden Kunst (Rolf Escher, Sergio Zanni, Viktor Müllerstaedt), Georgia Berlin Galerie (Berlin); Omaggio a Michelangelo Antonioni dagli amici della Galleria del Carbone, Galleria del Carbone (Ferrara)
 2013 – Biennale Internazionale di Scultura, Castello di Racconigi; I cercatori dell'immutabile, Spazio Rosso Tiziano (Piacenza)
 2014 – Künstler aus Ferrara, Italien, KREIS Galerie (Nürnberg)
 2021-2022 – Sergio Zanni. Volumi narranti, Padiglione di Arte Contemporanea, Ferrara

Notes

References 

 Baccilieri Adriano, Guberti Giulio, 1981. Aletheia/Lethe. L'immaginele pagano. Editore Comune di Ferrara, 60 pp.
 Baccilieri Adriano (a cura di), 1986. , 84 pp.
 Autori Vari, 1987. VII Rassegna Nazionale della ceramica. L'immagine e la cosa. Editore Comune di Caltagirone, Regione Siciliana.
 Autori Vari, 1988. Sergio Zanni – , 93 pp.
 Giansiracusa Paolo, 1988. Padania Etruria Magna Grecia. Editore Milano Fabbri, 95 pp.
 Micieli Nicola (a cura di), 1990. Premio Aldo Roncaglia. 22° Edizione. Editore Pontedera Bi & Vu, 44 pp.
 Franchi Francesco Piero, 1990. Sergio Zanni. Bronzi e terrecotte 1985 – 1990. Editore Il Bulino Edizioni d'Arte, Modena. Volume n. 13 della Collana: Le Murene. 32 pp. non numerate.
 Vesce Sandro, 1993. Sergio Zanni, Volo di notte. Editore Rosso Tiziano Arte, Piacenza, 12 pp.
 Campanini Graziano, Govoni Giorgia (2006): Di Ulisse e d’altri viandanti. Skira Ed., .
 Gallerie di Arte Moderna e Contemporanea, Ferrara, 

1942 births
Living people
Artists from Ferrara
20th-century Italian painters
Italian male painters
21st-century Italian painters
20th-century Italian sculptors
20th-century Italian male artists
Italian male sculptors
21st-century Italian sculptors
Modern artists
Italian contemporary artists
21st-century Italian male artists